Cyclic AMP-regulated phosphoprotein, 21 kD, also known as ARPP-21, is a human gene.

References

External links

Further reading